Alice by Heart is a musical with music by Duncan Sheik, lyrics by Steven Sater, and a book by Sater with Jessie Nelson. The musical is inspired by Lewis Carroll's 1865 novel Alice's Adventures in Wonderland and was originally presented by London's Royal National Theatre in 2012.

Plot overview
The musical takes place in 1941, in the debris after the London Blitz of World War II. The life of teen Alice Spencer is disrupted, as she and her best friend Alfred are forced to take shelter in a London underground tube station. However, Alfred, suffering from Tuberculosis, is quarantined ("West of Words"). Alice urges him to escape with her into their cherished book Alice's Adventures in Wonderland and travel down the rabbit hole to Wonderland. Nurse Cross, who is in charge of keeping everyone safe, rips Alice's book as a punishment for visiting Alfred, despite his quarantine. Alice becomes very defiant and declares she knows it "by heart" and will read to him anyway. 

The people hiding in the shelter slowly change into some of the book's characters, and Alfred himself changes into the White Rabbit ("Down the Hole"). During her time in Wonderland, Alice changes parts of the story, such as spending too much time with the White Rabbit and forgetting Chapter 3. She gets teased by not one, but two, Caterpillars ("Chillin' the Regrets"); receives advice from the Cheshire Cat; dances the Lobster Quadrille with the White Rabbit ("Those Long Eyes"); gets berated for growing up too fast by the Duchess; plays croquet with the Queen of Hearts ("Manage Your Flamingo") and other slight twists on scenes from Alice in Wonderland. 

Alfred tires of being the White Rabbit and wants to finish his life as himself, in the bunker with Alice, so he attempts to get her to finish the story early and to help her move on by taunting her as the much less friendly March Hare. She tells him she hates him for getting sick, however before she can apologize he gets taken to Ward D ("Sick to Death of Alice-ness").  Alice attempts to go to him but is halted by the Jabberwocky. The Jabberwocky taunts her with claims of insanity and grief. Alice defeats him with thoughts of Alfred. ("Brililig, Braelig").

The Cheshire Cat urges Alice to let Alfred go and face her grief ("Some Things Fall Away").  Alice soon meets Mock Turtles who encourage her to not move on and live wholly in her grief ("Your Shell of Grief").

Alfred returns, wishing to finish the story with Alice, but Alice, taking the Mock Turtles' advice, pleads with him not to move on. Alfred asks how Alice will grieve him, both of them lamenting of what could have been ("Another Room In Your Head"). She tries to kiss him, hoping to contract Tuberculosis and die with him. He refuses, resuming the story as the hateful March Hare despite her protests. 

During the trial ("Isn't It a Trial"/"Do You Think We Think You're Alice?"), Alice stands up for herself, and finally, Alfred joins her. With the help of Tabatha as the Cheshire Cat, they break out of Wonderland and back into the bunker ("I've Shrunk Enough"). Alfred and Alice then admit their feelings for each other before Alfred dies ("Afternoon"). The show ends with Alice finally accepting Alfred's death, and trying to be optimistic about life with everyone else in the bunker ("Winter Blooms").

Background 
Alice by Heart was originally commissioned by London's Royal National Theatre in 2012, and was performed by youth companies around the U.K. The musical was developed as a workshop by Theatre Aspen (Aspen, Colorado) in July 2014. The musical received an additional workshop by MCC Theater in December 2015. New York Stage and Film & Vassar at the Powerhouse Theater presented a workshop production in July 2018. Director Jessie Nelson noted: “We’re attempting to explore the power of a book and what the story has meant to this girl...”

The musical made its Off-Broadway premiere at the Newman Mills Theatre at the Robert W. Wilson MCC Theater Space in January 2019, with an official opening on February 26, for a limited run until April 7, 2019.

Productions 
The world premiere production of Alice by Heart was announced on March 21, 2018 as part of MCC's inaugural season in its new permanent two-venue off-Broadway home. Casting was announced on October 23. The production opened Off-Broadway on February 26, 2019 at the MCC Theater, following previews from January 30, with the closing set for April 7. The closing date was extended from March 31. It is directed by Jessie Nelson with choreography by Rick and Jeff Kuperman, sets by Edward Pierce, costumes by Paloma Young and lighting by Bradley King.

Musical numbers

Off-Broadway 
 "West of Words" – Alice, Alfred, Tabatha & Company
 "Down the Hole" – Company 
 "Still" – Alice & White Rabbit 
 "Chillin' the Regrets" – Caterpillars, Alice & Company 
 "The Key Is" – Alice, White Rabbit, Caterpillars & Company 
 "So" – Magpie, Eaglet, Duck, Canary, Dodo & Pigeon°
 "Those Long Eyes" – Cheshire Cat, Alice & White Rabbit 
 "Manage Your Flamingo" – Duchess & Company 
 "Sick to Death of Alice-ness" – Mad Hatter, March Hare, Dormouse & Alice 
 "Brillig Braelig" – Jabberwocky, Alice & Company
 "Some Things Fall Away" – Cheshire Cat
 "Your Shell of Grief" – Mock Turtles & Alice 
 "Another Room in Your Head" – Alfred, Alice & Company 
 "Isn't It a Trial?" – Queen of Hearts & Company 
 "Do You Think We Think You're Alice?" – Company 
 "I've Shrunk Enough" – Alice & Company 
 "Still (Reprise)" – Alfred & Alice°
 "Afternoon" – Alice, Alfred & Company 
 "Winter Blooms" – Alice, Cheshire Cat & Company 
 "Down the Hole (Reprise)" – Company°

°Not included in the Original Cast Recording

Characters and original cast

 Kim Blanck portrayed the Cheshire Cat in the last shows in MCC when Nkeki left to play Tina Turner in the West End.

Reception
The Off-Broadway production received mixed reviews. While some praised the visual aspects of the story and some of the performances, many criticized the story, calling it muddled, confusing and were unable to see the parallels of the London Blitz of WWII and Alice in Wonderland. Some critics also gave the show unfavorable comparisons to Spring Awakening, which Sheik and Sater both worked on together.

Ben Brantley of The New York Times stated "The real-world characters are so hastily established and sketchily drawn that there's nothing compelling or surprising in their metamorphoses. It's also hard to grasp any necessary relationship between war-warped London in 1941 and the particulars of Wonderland."

David Cote, of The Observer, drew a comparison with Spring Awakening in his review "The difference: Spring Awakening was a straightforward adaptation of playwright Frank Wedekind's satirical-tragical portrait of hormonal adolescents and hypocritical adults in 19th-century Germany. Sater pared down the text and added his tender, sensual lyrics. Sheik brought his ruminative but groove-smart talent to the table. The result was a potent collision of signifiers-teen rebellion that transcended the historical period through emo rock. Alice By Heart is a more muddled concoction, tangled up in too many layers of reality and fantasy, trauma and whimsy, to deliver its emotional payload."

Matt Windman gave the show two out of four stars and stated, "Although sincerely intended and full of creative touches, "Alice by Heart" is a disjointed, depressing and bewildering mess. It would be near impossible to follow it without a working knowledge of the source material."

Some reviewers took a more positive approach. Frank Rizzo of Variety praised the performances, stating "The cast is solid, though the peripheral characters are thinly drawn even as their surreal alter egos revel in extravagance. Wesley Taylor has an especially fine time as the Mad Hatter, and Andrew Kober takes on five roles with flair, including King of Hearts and an imposing Jabberwocky."

Elysa Gardner of New York Stage Review, in another positive review,  described the show as "a darkly whimsical, utterly transporting musical that recalls Awakening both in its general focus-on anxious, pining youths who must pay the price for their elders' folly-and the lush, often melancholy but exhilarating beauty of its score."

Awards and honors

Original Off-Broadway production

Recording
An original cast recording was released through Sh-K-Boom Records on June 28, 2019. It peaked at number 5 on the US Cast Albums chart.

Book
A novelization of the same name by Sater was published on February 4, 2020.

References

External links 
 Official website
 Internet Off-Broadway listing

2019 musicals
Off-Broadway musicals
Musicals based on novels
Works based on Alice in Wonderland
Fiction set in 1941